Meriam Ben Hussein is a Tunisian actress.

Filmography

Television

series 
 2012–2014 : Maktoub (seasons 3–4) by Sami Fehri : Malek
 2013 : Layem by Khaled Barsaoui
 2015 : Naouret El Hawa (seasons 2) by Madih Belaïd : Alya
 2015 : Histoires tunisiennes by Nada Mezni Hafaiedh : Baya
 2017 : Flashback (seasons 2) by Mourad Ben Cheikh
 2018 : Tej El Hadhira by Sami Fehri : Lella Mannena
 2019 : El Maestro by Lassaad Oueslati
 2019 : Nouba by Abdelhamid Bouchnak : Salma

Emissions

Animator 
 2001 : Hit Parade on El Watania 1
 2008–2009 : Yalli Mâana on Hannibal TV
 2011 : Hadra mouch ki okhtha on 
 2012 : Taratata on Dubai TV
 2014 : Andi Manghanilek on El Hiwar El Tounsi
 2017 : Howa w Hia on Attessia TV
 2018 :  with Mariem Ben Hussein on Attessia TV

Radio 
 2012 : Mechwar on Radio IFM
 2013 : Drive Time on Radio Kalima
 2014 : Drive Time on Cap FM

References

External links

Tunisian film actresses
People from Tunis
Living people
20th-century Tunisian actresses
Year of birth missing (living people)